Analanjirofo is a region in northeastern Madagascar. Until 2009 it was a part of Toamasina Province. It borders Sava Region to the north, Sofia Region to the west, Alaotra-Mangoro Region to the southwest and Atsinanana Region to the south.

The capital of the region is Fenoarivo Atsinanana, and the population was 1,152,345 in 2018.

Administrative divisions
Analanjirofo Region is divided into six districts, which are sub-divided into 63 communes.

 Fenoarivo-Atsinanana District - 14 communes; a.k.a. Fenerive Est
 Mananara Avaratra District - 16 communes; a.k.a. Mananara Nord
 Maroantsetra District - 20 communes
 Nosy Boraha District - 1 commune; a.k.a. Île Sainte-Marie
 Soanierana Ivongo District - 9 communes
 Vavatenina District - 11 communes

Transport

Airports
Mananara Avaratra Airport
Maroantsetra Airport
Nosy Boraha Airport

Protected areas
 Part of Ankeniheny-Zahamena Corridor
 Tampolo New Protected Area
 Pointe-à-Larrée Special Reserve 
 Part of Zahamena National Park
 Mananara Nord National Park
 Part of Masoala National Park
 Nosy Mangabe Reserve
 Ambatovaky Reserve
 Andreba New Protected Area
 Part of Makira Natural Park

See also
 2016 THB Champions League
 2019 THB Champions League
 Cyclone Herold
 Cyclone Ivan

References

 
Regions of Madagascar